The discography of Colin Hay, a Scottish-born Australian singer, consists of fifteen studio albums, two video albums and twenty-nine singles (including five as a featured artist). Before his solo career commenced in 1986, Hay was the lead vocalist of the band Men at Work.

Albums

Studio albums

Video albums

Singles

As lead artist

As featured artist

Other appearances

See also
 Men at Work
 Ringo Starr & His All-Starr Band

References

Discographies of Australian artists
Pop music discographies
Rhythm and blues discographies